Alexander John Kosmina (born 17 August 1956), known as John Kosmina, is an Australian former football (soccer) player and manager, most recently being the Senior Head Coach of Brisbane Strikers. He is a member of the Football Federation Australia Football Hall of Fame.

Club career
Kosmina is of Polish Australian ethnicity. He played for Polonia and then West Adelaide, before signing for English side Arsenal in February 1978. However, he only played one first-team league game for the Gunners (as a substitute against Leeds United on 19 August 1978), along with 3 appearances (2 as a substitute) in that season's UEFA cup. He was the first Australian to play for Arsenal. He returned to Australia in May 1979.

On his return, he went on to become one of the National Soccer League's most prolific scorers, with stints at Adelaide City, West Adelaide (for a second time), Sydney City, Sydney Olympic and A.P.I.A. Leichhardt Tigers before retiring in 1989. The most successful of these was with Sydney City, being part of their 1981 and 1982 championship winning teams, as well as being the league's top scorer in 1982.

Managerial career
After retiring, he began coaching the Warringah Dolphins in the New South Wales state leagues, before coaching NSL side Newcastle Breakers, followed by a stint at the Brisbane Strikers. Both stints were largely unsuccessful, his sides reaching the finals only once.

Adelaide United

In 2003, he became the inaugural coach of Adelaide United. Kosmina coached United to an impressive 3rd in the final season of the NSL. Maintaining his job for the inaugural season of the A-League, Kosmina led his side to the Minor Premiership but a poor finals series saw them finish 3rd overall. The next season saw mixed results for Kosmina and Adelaide United.

Finishing 2nd on the table behind Melbourne Victory, Adelaide managed to reach the grand final, only to be thrashed 6–0. Kosmina's criticism of the refereeing of that match, coupled with the devastating loss and a touchline ban earlier during the season for a scuffle with Victory captain Kevin Muscat, saw him forced to resign by the Adelaide board.

He was then appointed by Socceroos coach Graham Arnold as his assistant for the 2007 Asian Cup.

Sydney FC

After the sacking of Branko Culina by the Sydney Football Club Board, Kosmina was confirmed on 24 October 2007 as the new Sydney FC coach. Since signing with Sydney FC Kosmina made an immediate impact; winning his first game with Sydney 3–2 against rivals Central Coast Mariners at the Sydney Football Stadium.

Sydney FC beat the LA Galaxy 5–3 at Sydney's Telstra Stadium in a friendly, and also won a thrilling 5–4 victory against the Central Coast Mariners at Bluetongue Stadium. Following Sydney FC's poor run in the 2008/2009 season (missing the finals for the first time), John Kosmina had his contract terminated in late January 2009.

Adelaide Raiders
He was announced the manager of the Adelaide Raiders, a semi-professional club playing in the FFSA Super League. On 1 September 2011, it was announced he had signed as senior coach of FFSA Super League club Croydon Kings after more than 35 years away from the club. It was announced on 18 December 2011 that Croydon Kings had agreed to released Kosmina from his coaching contract so he could accept the Adelaide United manager position.

Return to Adelaide United
On 18 December 2011 he signed as caretaker coach with Adelaide United for the remainder of the 2011–12 A-League season. On 22 March 2012 it was announced he had signed a one-year contract with the club to stay on for the 2012–13 A-League season. On 28 January 2013 he stood down as manager of Adelaide United, citing a lack of trust at the club.

Brisbane City
In August 2015, Kosmina was appointed senior coach and football leader at National Premier Leagues Queensland club Brisbane City, signing a three-year contract. In November 2018, it was announced that he would join the coaching staff at St Joseph's College, Gregory Terrace, taking responsibility for the Open First and Second XI teams, as well as the Year 10 and 11 teams, as part of a partnership between the college and Brisbane City.

Brisbane Strikers 
In November 2020, Brisbane Strikers announced that Kosmina would return to the club as senior coach, 17 years after he last coached the side. After a string of shocking results Kosmina was sacked by the club on Monday 24 May

On 24 May 2021, it was announced via a club statement on the club website that the Brisbane Strikers and Kosmina would be parting ways. This decision came after a poor run of form which saw the Strikers not take a single point from their first ten games in the 2021 NPL Queensland Season.

Media
He occasionally appears on Fox Sports as a commentator and football analyst. Kosmina co-hosts a weekly Internet television show about football on Australia Live TV with Ross Aloisi, Two Up Front and the episodes are on AustraliaLiveTV.com.

International goals 
Scores and results list goal tally first.

Honours

Player
Sydney City
NSL Championship: 1981, 1982
NSL Cup: 1986

Individual
 FFA Hall of Fame: 1999
 NSL Top Scorer: 1982
 NSL Under 21 Player of the Year: 1977

Manager
Adelaide United
A-League Premiership: 2005–2006

Kosmina Street in the Sydney suburb of Glenwood is named for him.

John Kosmina Medal

The award given to the player of the match in the National Premier Leagues  Grand Final each year is named in his honour.

References

External links
 FFA – Hall of Fame profile
 Sydney FC profile
 Oz Football profile
 Two Up Front

1956 births
Living people
Soccer players from Adelaide
Australian people of Polish descent
Australian soccer players
Australian expatriate soccer players
Australian expatriate sportspeople in England
Australia international soccer players
Olympic soccer players of Australia
Footballers at the 1988 Summer Olympics
Australian soccer coaches
Croydon Kings players
West Adelaide SC players
Arsenal F.C. players
Sydney Olympic FC players
Adelaide United FC managers
Sydney FC managers
National Soccer League (Australia) players
Sutherland Sharks FC players
A-League Men managers
Association football forwards
Hakoah Sydney City East FC players
Brisbane Strikers coaches